Gopaludu Bhoopaludu is a 1967 Indian Telugu-language swashbuckler film, produced by S. Bhavanarayana under the Gauri Productions banner and directed by G. Viswanathan. It stars N. T. Rama Rao, Jayalalithaa and Rajasree, with music composed by S. P. Kodandapani.

Plot 
Once upon a time, there was a kingdom Kuntala where the royal dynasty suffers from a curse that the brothers have been killing one another for the past 7 generations. At present, the queen gives birth to twins. On the same day, the King was murdered by his brother and he too kills him. The Queen feels that her children should not repeat it, so, she sends away one child with the maid. On the way, the maid gets killed by a tiger and the child was protected by Mangamma a shepherd woman, who rears him as her own. Years roll by, Gopi becomes a shepherd and in the fort, the elder Raja becomes the king. Now the Queen wants to perform Raja's marriage with her brother Sripathi's daughter Padmavati. But Raja is already in love with a wild beauty Rajani and he always spends time along with her in the forest on the pretext of hunting. Veerabahu, Raja's vicious cousin, waiting to grab the kingdom by eliminating Raja. Mahanasa, his agent informs him about Raja's love affair, so he sends his henchmen in veils to capture Raja. Gopi notices it and protects him when Raja is surprised by the likeness between them and invites him to the fort. After seeing Gopi, the Queen suspects him as her twin son and gets afraid of the curse, so she asks Raja to send him away. Parallelly, Gopi and Padma fall in love. Once Raja and Gopi exchange their places.

Meanwhile, various competitions are held in the capital city on the occasion of full moon day. So, Raja starts to the fort, in between, he has been seized by Veerabahu's men. At the fort, Gopi is in a dilemma as Raja has not arrived, so, he participates in the competition and wins. Here Veerabahu learns that they are two, so, he brings Mangamma to the fort, but Gopi refuses to recognize her. The Queen calls Mangamma and finds out that Gopi is her second son. In anger, she reveals the truth to Gopi when he blames her for making him an orphan. Immediately he rushes to the forest and says apologies to Mangamma. Padma who follows him listens to their conversation. At present, Gopi plays a drama to protect the kingdom from Veerabahu by behaving himself like a monarch. He arrests Sripati, also locks up Padma, and becomes arch-rival to Veerabahu. By scheming, various plans and tricks, he finds out the hidden place of Raja. Meanwhile, Rajani also notices Raja is under the custody of Veerabahu, so, she too reaches there. Gopi protects Raja by putting his life at risk and stamps out Veerabahu. Then, the queen understands the love and affection between the brothers, realizes her mistake, and decides to reveal the truth, But Gopi stops her, as the world should not blame his mother when Gopi is about to leave, Raja stops him and changes his intention. Finally, the movie ends on a happy note with the marriages of Raja with Rajani and Gopi to Padma.

Cast 
N. T. Rama Rao as Raja and Gopi (dual role)
Jayalalitha as Rajini
Rajasree as Padmavathi Devi
Rajanala as Veerabahu
Satyanarayana as Bheemanna
Padmanabham as Kopiri
Allu Ramalingaiah as Mahanasa
Mikkilineni as Sripathi
Prabhakar Reddy as Kunthala Maharaju
Jagga Rao as Bandi
S. Varalakshmi as Raja Maata
Hemalatha as Mangamma
Vanisri as Madhuram

Soundtrack 

Music composed by S. P. Kodandapani.

References

External links 
 

1967 films
1960s Telugu-language films
Indian swashbuckler films
Indian fantasy adventure films
1960s fantasy adventure films